Tasserkidrilus is a genus of annelids belonging to the family Naididae.

The species of this genus are found in Eurasia and Northern America.

Species:
 Tasserkidrilus acapillatus Finogenova, 1972 
 Tasserkidrilus americanus (Brinkhurst & Cook, 1966)

References

Naididae